The 2001 Australian Open was a tennis tournament played on outdoor hard courts at Melbourne Park in Melbourne in Australia. It was the 89th edition of the Australian Open and was held from 15 through 28 January 2001.

Seniors

Men's singles

 Andre Agassi defeated  Arnaud Clément 6–4, 6–2, 6–2
 It was Agassi's 7th career Grand Slam title and his 3rd Australian Open title.

Women's singles

 Jennifer Capriati defeated  Martina Hingis 6–4, 6–3
 It was Capriati's 1st career Grand Slam title and her 1st Australian Open title.

Men's doubles

 Jonas Björkman /  Todd Woodbridge defeated  Byron Black /  David Prinosil 6–1, 5–7, 6–4, 6–4
 It was Björkman's 3rd career Grand Slam title and his 3rd Australian Open title. It was Woodbridge's 18th career Grand Slam title and his 4th Australian Open title.

Women's doubles

 Serena Williams /  Venus Williams defeated  Lindsay Davenport /  Corina Morariu 6–2, 2–6, 6–4
 It was Serena Williams's 7th career Grand Slam title and her 1st Australian Open title. It was Venus Williams's 8th career Grand Slam title and her 2nd Australian Open title.

Mixed doubles

 Corina Morariu /  Ellis Ferreira defeated  Barbara Schett /  Joshua Eagle 6–1, 6–3
 It was Morariu's 2nd and last career Grand Slam title and her only Australian Open title. It was Ferreira's 2nd and last career Grand Slam title and his 2nd Australian Open title.

Juniors

Boys' singles

 Janko Tipsarević defeated  Wang Yeu-tzuoo 3–6, 7–5, 6–0

Girls' singles

 Jelena Janković defeated  Sofia Arvidsson 6–2, 6–1

Boys' doubles

 Ytai Abougzir /  Luciano Vitullo defeated  Frank Dancevic /  Giovanni Lapentti 6–4, 7–6 (7–5)

Girls' doubles

 Petra Cetkovská /   Barbora Strýcová defeated  Anna Bastrikova /  Svetlana Kuznetsova 7–6 (7–3), 1–6, 6–4

Legends

Men's doubles
  John Fitzgerald /  Wally Masur defeated  Darren Cahill /  Brad Drewett, 6–2, 6–4,

Mixed doubles
  Nicole Bradtke /  Tony Roche defeated  Elizabeth Smylie /  Stan Smith, 2–6, 6–2, 7–5

Seeds

Men's singles
  Gustavo Kuerten (second round, lost to Greg Rusedski)
  Marat Safin (fourth round, lost to Dominik Hrbatý)
  Pete Sampras (fourth round, lost to Todd Martin)
  Yevgeny Kafelnikov (quarterfinals, lost to Arnaud Clément)
  Magnus Norman (fourth round, lost to Sébastien Grosjean)
  Andre Agassi (champion)
  Lleyton Hewitt (third round, lost to Carlos Moyá)
  Tim Henman (fourth round, lost to Patrick Rafter)
  Juan Carlos Ferrero (second round, lost to Andrew Ilie)
  Wayne Ferreira (third round, lost to Andreas Vinciguerra)
  Franco Squillari (second round, lost to Daniel Nestor)
  Patrick Rafter (semifinals, lost to Andre Agassi)
  Cédric Pioline (third round, lost to Todd Martin)
  Dominik Hrbatý (quarterfinals, lost to Patrick Rafter)
  Arnaud Clément (final, lost to Andre Agassi)
  Sébastien Grosjean (semifinal, lost to Arnaud Clément)

Women's singles
  Martina Hingis (final, lost to Jennifer Capriati)
  Lindsay Davenport (semifinals, lost to Jennifer Capriati)
  Venus Williams (semifinals, lost to Martina Hingis)
  Monica Seles (quarterfinals, lost to Jennifer Capriati)
  Conchita Martínez (second round, lost to Emmanuelle Gagliardi)
  Serena Williams (quarterfinals, lost to Martina Hingis)
  Mary Pierce (third round, lost to Paola Suárez)
  Anna Kournikova (quarterfinals, lost to Lindsay Davenport)
  Elena Dementieva (third round, lost to Dája Bedáňová)
  Amanda Coetzer (quarterfinals, lost to Venus Williams)
  Chanda Rubin (first round, lost to Janette Husárová)
  Jennifer Capriati (champion)
  Amélie Mauresmo (fourth round, lost to Venus Williams)
  Sandrine Testud (third round, lost to Justine Henin)
  Kim Clijsters (fourth round, lost to Lindsay Davenport)
  Amy Frazier (second round, lost to Rita Grande)

References

 
 

 
2001 ATP Tour
2001 WTA Tour
2001 in tennis
2001 in Australian tennis
2001,Australian Open
January 2001 sports events in Australia